Draginac may refer to:

Draginac (Babušnica), a village in Babušnica, Serbia
Draginac (Loznica), a village in Loznica, Serbia